Lontong balap (lit. racing rice cake) is an Indonesian traditional rice dish, well known in Javanese cuisine, made of lontong (pressed rice cake), tauge (bean sprouts), fried tofu, lentho (black-eyed pea fritter), fried shallots, sambal petis and sweet soy sauce. East Javanese lontong and tofu recipes are known of their distinctive flavour, acquired from generous amount of petis (a type of shrimp paste). The origin of the dish is from Surabaya in East Java, Indonesia.

See also

Lontong
Arem-arem
Lontong cap go meh
Lontong dekem
Lontong kari
Lontong sayur

References

Indonesian rice dishes
Javanese cuisine